Françoise d'Orléans may refer to:
Françoise d'Orléans (1549–1601), the second wife of Louis, Prince of Condé (1530–1569)
Françoise Madeleine d'Orléans (1648–1664), Duchess of Savoy 
Françoise d'Orléans (1844–1925), Duchess of Chartres
Françoise d'Orléans (1902–1953), Princess of Greece and Denmark by marriage